Romain Barras (born 1 August 1980 in Calais, Pas-de-Calais) is a French decathlete. At the Universiade he finished fifth in 2001 and first in 2003, the latter in a personal-best score of 8,196 points. He represented France at the 2004 Summer Olympics and came in thirteenth place overall in the decathlon. He became the regional champion at the 2005 Mediterranean Games.

He improved his personal best to 8,298 points for third place at the 2007 TNT - Fortuna Meeting. He finished fifth in the decathlon at the 2008 Beijing Olympics and was twelfth at the 2009 World Championships in Athletics. Barras set a personal best of 8,313 points to win at the 2010 European Cup Combined Events in Tallinn, Estonia.

On 29 July 2010, Barras won the decathlon gold medal at the 2010 European Championships in Barcelona with a score of 8,453. He took part in the 2010 Décastar meeting in September and finished third with 8,180 points.

Following the end of his competitive career, he focused on coaching and was a professor of sports and physical education.

Achievements

References

External links 
 

1980 births
Living people
Sportspeople from Calais
French decathletes
Olympic decathletes
Olympic athletes of France
Athletes (track and field) at the 2004 Summer Olympics
Athletes (track and field) at the 2008 Summer Olympics
Universiade medalists in athletics (track and field)
World Athletics Championships athletes for France
European Athletics Championships medalists
Academics of physical education and sport
Mediterranean Games gold medalists for France
Mediterranean Games medalists in athletics
Athletes (track and field) at the 2005 Mediterranean Games
Universiade gold medalists for France
Medalists at the 2003 Summer Universiade